The 51st Annual Australian Film Institute Awards ceremony, honouring the best in film and television acting achievements for 2009 in the cinema of Australia, took place over two nights on 5 December 2009 and 11 December 2009. During the ceremonies, the Australian Film Institute presented Australian Film Institute Awards (AFI awards) in 40 categories, including feature films, television, animation, and documentary. The ceremony was hosted by Julia Zemiro of SBS's RocKwiz. Winners are listed first and highlighted in boldface; with nominees thereafter.

AFI Film Awards
{| class=wikitable style="width="150%"
|-
| valign="top" width="50%"|

Samson and Delilah – Kath ShelperBalibo – Anthony LaPaglia, Dominic Purcell
Beautiful Kate – Bryan Brown, Leah Churchill-Brown
Blessed – Al Clark
Mao's Last Dancer – Jane Scott
Mary and Max – Melanie Coombs
| valign="top" width="50%"|Warwick Thornton – Samson and Delilah
Bruce Beresford – Mao's Last Dancer
Robert Connolly – Balibo
Rachel Ward – Beautiful Kate
|-
! style="background:#eedd82;" ! style="width="50%" | Best Original Screenplay
! style="background:#DBD090;" ! style="width="50%" | Best Adapted Screenplay
|-
| valign="top" |
Warwick Thornton – Samson and Delilah
Sarah Watt – My Year Without Sex
Serhat Caradee – Cedar Boys
Adam Elliot – Mary and Max
| valign="top" |
Robert Connolly, David Williamson – Balibo, based on the killing of the Balibo Five
Rachel Ward – Beautiful Kate, based on the novel Beautiful Kate by Newton Thornburg
Andrew Bovell, Patricia Cornelius, Melissa Reeves, Christos Tsiolkas – Blessed, based on the play Who's Afraid of the Working Class? by Andrew Bovell
Jan Sardi – Mao's Last Dancer, based on the autobiographical novel of the same name by Li Cunxin
|-
! style="background:#DBD090;" ! style="width="50%" | Best Lead Actor
! style="background:#DBD090;" ! style="width="50%" | Best Lead Actress
|-
| valign="top" |
Anthony LaPaglia as Roger East – Balibo
Rowan McNamara as Samson – Samson and Delilah
Ben Mendelsohn as Ned Kendall – Beautiful Kate
Hugo Weaving as Thomas Kev – Last Ride
| valign="top" |
Frances O'Connor as Rhonda – Blessed
Marissa Gibson as Delilah – Samson and Delilah
Sacha Horler as Natalie – My Year Without Sex
Sophie Lowe as Kate – Beautiful Kate
|-
! style="background:#DBD090;" ! style="width="50%" | Best Supporting Actor
! style="background:#DBD090;" ! style="width="50%" | Best Supporting Actress
|-
| valign="top" |
Oscar Isaac as José Ramos-Horta – Balibo
Bryan Brown as Bruce Kendall – Beautiful Kate
Damon Gameau as Greg Shackleton – Balibo
Brandon Walters as Nullah – Australia
| valign="top" |
Rachel Griffiths as Sally Kendall – Beautiful Kate
Maeve Dermody as Toni – Beautiful Kate
Mitjili Napanangka Gibson as Nana – Samson and Delilah
Bea Viegas as Juliana – Balibo
|-
! style="background:#DBD090;" ! style="width="50%" | Best Cinematography
! style="background:#DBD090;" ! style="width="50%" | Best Editing
|-
| valign="top" |
Warwick Thornton – Samson and Delilah
Andrew Commis – Beautiful Kate
Greig Fraser – Last Ride
Tristan Milani – Balibo
| valign="top" |
Nick Meyers – Balibo
Jill Bilcock – Blessed 
Mark Warner – Mao's Last Dancer
Roland Gallois – Samson and Delilah
|-
! style="background:#DBD090;" ! style="width="50%" | Best Original Music Score
! style="background:#DBD090;" ! style="width="50%" | Best Sound
|-
| valign="top" |
Christopher Gordon – Mao's Last Dancer
David Hirschfelder – Australia
Lisa Gerrard – Balibo
Warwick Thornton – Samson and Delilah| valign="top" |
Liam Egan, Tony Murtagh, Robert Sullivan, Yulia Akerholt, Les Fiddess – Samson and Delilah
Wayne Pashley, Guntis Sics – Australia 
Sam Petty, Emma Bortignon, Phil Heywood, Ann Aucote – BaliboDavid Lee, Andrew Neil, Yulia Akerholt, Mark Franken, Roger Savage – Mao's Last Dancer|-
! style="background:#DBD090;" ! style="width="50%" | Best Production Design
! style="background:#DBD090;" ! style="width="50%" | Best Costume Design
|-
| valign="top" |
Catherine Martin, Ian Gracie, Karen Murphy, Beverley Dunn – Australia
Robert Cousins – BaliboHerbert Pinter – Mao's Last DancerAdam Elliot – Mary and Max| valign="top" |
Catherine Martin, Eliza Godman – Australia
Cappi Ireland – BaliboMariot Kerr – Lucky CountryAnna Borghesi – Mao's Last Dancer|-
|}

AFI Young Actor Award
 Marissa Gibson, Rowan McNamara. Samson & Delilah
 Brandon Walters. Australia Sebastian Gregory. Beautiful Toby Wallace. Lucky CountryAFI Highest Grossing Film Award
 Australia. Marc Wooldridge, Baz Luhrmann, G. Mac Brown, Catherine Knapman, Paul Watters, Stuart Beattie, Ronald Harwood, Richard Flanagan Charlie & Boots. Andrew Mackie, Michael Selwyn, David Redman, Dean Murphy, Shana Levine, Stewart Faichney
 Mao's Last Dancer. Joel Pearlman, Troy Lum, Jane Scott, Bruce Beresford, Jan Sardi

AFI Television Awards

AFI Award for Best Television Drama Series

AFI Award for Best Telefeature, Mini-Series or Short-Run Series

AFI Award for Best Direction in Television

AFI Award for Best Screenplay in Television

AFI Award for Best Lead Actor in a Television Drama
 Roy Billing. Underbelly: A Tale of Two Cities. Nine Network Robert Menzies. 3 Acts of Murder. ABC1
 Don Hany. East West 101 (Season 2). SBS
 Dougray Scott. False Witness. UKTV

AFI Award for Best Lead Actress in a Television Drama
 Susie Porter. East West 101 (Season 2). SBS Rachael Blake. False Witness. UKTV
 Rebecca Gibney. Packed to the Rafters. Seven Network
 Asher Keddie. Underbelly: A Tale of Two Cities. Nine Network

AFI Award for Best Guest or Supporting Actor in a Television Drama
 Damian De Montemas. Underbelly: A Tale of Two Cities (Episode 11, "The Brotherhood"). Nine Network Bille Brown. 3 Acts of Murder. ABC1
 Jeremy Lindsay Taylor. False Witness (Episode 2). UKTV
 Richard Roxburgh. False Witness (Episode 2). UKTV

AFI Award for Best Guest or Supporting Actress in a Television Drama
 Anni Finsterer. 3 Acts of Murder. ABC1 Claire Forlani. False Witness (Episode 1). UKTV
 Kathryn Beck. Scorched. Nine Network
 Kate Ritchie. Underbelly: A Tale of Two Cities (Episode 4, "Business as Usual"). Nine Network

AFI Award for Best Children's Television Drama
 The Elephant Princess. Jonathan M. Shiff, Joanna Werner. Network Ten Time Trackers. Sue Taylor, Donna Malane, Dave Gibson, Paula Boock. Seven Network

AFI Award for Best Children's Television Animation
 Figaro Pho. Luke Jurevicius. ABC1 The Adventures of Charlotte and Henry. Paige Livingston. Seven Network
 Classic Tales. Noel Price. ABC
 Zeke's Pad. Avrill Stark, Delna Bhesania, Liz Scully, Leonard Terhoch. Seven Network

AFI Award for Best Light Entertainment Television Series
 Spicks and Specks. Anthony Watt. ABC The Gruen Transfer (Series 2). Andrew Denton, Anita Jacoby, Jon Casimir, Debbie Cuell. ABC
 RocKwiz. Brian Nankervis, Ken Connor, Peter Bain-Hogg, Joe Connor. SBS

AFI Award for Best Performance in a Television Comedy
 Phil Lloyd. Review with Myles Barlow. ABC Robyn Butler. The Librarians (Series 2). ABC
 Kym Gyngell. Very Small Business. ABC1
 Wayne Hope. Very Small Business. ABC1

AFI Award for Best Television Comedy Series
 Review with Myles Barlow. Dean Bates. ABC Chandon Pictures. Rob Carlton. Movie Network
 Lawrence Leung's Choose Your Own Adventure. Nathan Earl, Andy Nehl, Craig Melville. ABC1
 Very Small Business. Wayne Hope, Robyn Butler. ABC1

AFI Award for Outstanding Achievement in Television Screen Craft
 Luke Jurevicius. Figaro Pho. For "Creative Excellence"AFI Non-Feature Film Awards

AFI Award for Best Feature-Length Documentary
 Glass: A Portrait of Philip in Twelve Parts. Scott Hicks, Susanne Preissler Bastardy. Philippa Campey, Amiel Courtin-Wilson, Lynn-Maree Milburn, Andrew de Groot
 The Choir. Chris Hilton, Michael Davie
 Lionel. Lizzette Atkins

AFI Award for Best Direction in a Documentary
 The Choir. Michael Davie Bastardy. Amiel Courtin-Wilson
 First Australians (Episode 4, "There is No Other Law"). Rachel Perkins. SBS
 The Love Market. Shalom Almond. National Geographic

AFI Award for Best Cinematography in a Documentary
 Cracking the Colour Code (Episode 2, "Making Colours"). Ian Batt, Vincent Fooy. SBS Beyond Kokoda ("Buying Time"). Stig Schnell, Shaun Gibbons, Brett Murphy, Ben Nunney. Foxtel
 My Asian Heart. David Bradbury
 Salt. Murray Fredericks. ABC

AFI Award for Best Editing in a Documentary
 How Kevin Bacon Cured Cancer. Zen Rosenthal. ABC Bastardy. Bill Murphy, Jack Hutchings, Richard Lowenstein
 Cracking the Colour Code (Episode 2, "Making Colours"). Lawrie Silvestrin. SBS
 Yes Madam, Sir. Megan Doneman, Annie Collins

AFI Award for Best Sound in a Documentary
 Intangible Asset Number 82. Matthew Ferris, Michael Gissing, Andrew McGrath The Choir. Sam Hayward, Phil Judd, Felicity Fox, Alli Heynes, Phil Vail, David White
 Glass: A Portrait of Philip in Twelve Parts. Stephen R. Smith, Peter Smith, Tom Heuzenroeder, Adrian Medhurst
 Lionel. Nick Batterham, Keith Thomas, Cezary Skubiszewski

AFI Award for Best Documentary Under One Hour
 Solo. Jennifer Peedom. ABC1 The Love Market. Shalom Almond. National Geographic
 Salt. Michael Angus. ABC
 Tackling Peace. Marc Radomsky. Network Ten

AFI Award for Best Documentary Series
 First Australians. Darren  Dale, Rachel Perkins, Helen Panckhurst. SBS Beyond Kokoda. Stig Schnell, Shaun Gibbons. Foxtel
 Once Bitten. Beth Frey, Janette Howe. SBS
 Voices from the Cape. David Selvarajah Vadiveloo, Anna Kaplan. ABC1

AFI Award for Best Short Animation
 The Cat Piano. Jessica Brentnall, Eddie White, Ari Gibson Chicken of God. Jodi Satya, Frank Woodley
 The Not-so-Great Eugene Green. Melanie Brunt, Michael Hill
 Reach. Luke Randall

AFI Award for Best Short Fiction Film
 Miracle Fish. Drew Bailey, Luke Doolan Burn. Anna Kaplan, David Selvarajah Vadiveloo
 Liebermans in the Sky. Jessica Redenbach, Richard Vilensky
 Water. Sarah Shaw, Corrie Jones

AFI Award for Best Screenplay in a Short Film
 Miracle Fish. Luke Doolan Boxer. Michael Latham
 Liebermans in the Sky. Richard Vilensky
 Water. Corrie Jones, Sarah Shaw, Ian Meadows

AFI Award for Outstanding Achievement in Short Film Screen Craft
 Andrew McLeod. Water. For "Cinematography"AFI Special Film Awards

Byron Kennedy Award
 Ray BrownNews Limited Readers' Choice Award
 Mao's Last Dancer. Jane Scott Australia. Baz Luhrmann, G. Mac Brown, Catherine Knapman
 Charlie & Boots. David Redman, Dean Murphy, Shana Levine
 Samson & Delilah. Kath Shelper

AFI International Award for Best Actor
 Russell Crowe. State of Play Martin Henderson. House. Network Ten
 Anthony LaPaglia. Without a Trace. Nine Network
 Guy Pearce. Bedtime Stories

AFI International Award for Best Actress
 Toni Collette. United States of Tara. ABC1 Rose Byrne. Damages. Foxtel
 Melissa George. In Treatment. Foxtel
 Mia Wasikowska. In Treatment. Foxtel

AFI Members' Choice Award
 Samson & Delilah. Kath Shelper Australia. Baz Luhrmann, G. Mac Brown, Catherine Knapman
 Balibo. John Maynard, Rebecca Williamson
 Beautiful Kate. Leah Churchill-Brown, Bryan Brown
 Mao's Last Dancer. Jane Scott
 Mary and Max. Melanie Coombs

AFI Visual Effects Award
 Australia. Chris Godfrey, James E. Price, Andy Brown, Rob Duncan Death of the Megabeasts. Matt Drummond, Mike Dunn
 Plastic. Sandy Widyanata, Eric So, Mathew Mackereth, Christopher Jackson
 Scorched. Bertrand Polivka, Soren Jensen. Nine Network

AFI International Award for Excellence in Filmmaking
 Nathan McGuinness. Senior Visual Effects Supervisor. Transformers: Revenge of the Fallen, The Taking of Pelham 1 2 3, Terminator: Salvation, The Unborn, The Curious Case of Benjamin ButtonAFI Outstanding Achievement Dinner
The following two AFI Awards were presented at the AFI Outstanding Achievement Dinner in August.

AFI Raymond Longford Award
 Geoffrey RushAFI Award for Screen Content Innovation
 Gallipoli: The First Day. Sam Doust, Meena Tharmarajah, Astrid Scott'''
 Forlorn Gaze. Sarah-Jane Woulahan
 Scarygirl. Sophie Byrne, Nathan Jurevicius
 Scorched''. Ellenor Cox, Marcus Gillezeau

Film
A
A
AFI
AFI